The Captain's Paradise is a 1953 British comedy film produced and directed by Anthony Kimmins, and starring Alec Guinness, Yvonne De Carlo and Celia Johnson. Guinness plays the captain of a passenger ship that travels regularly between Gibraltar and Spanish Morocco. De Carlo plays his Moroccan wife and Johnson plays his British wife. The film begins at just before the end of the story, which is then told in a series of flashbacks.

In 1958, the story was made into a Broadway musical comedy, retitled Oh, Captain!.

Plot 
In early 1950s North Africa, a man (Alec Guinness) is escorted through an angry, clamouring crowd by a platoon of soldiers. They enter a fort and it is clear that he is to be executed. The commander (Peter Bull) orders the men to line up in two rows and gives the order to fire. As the shots ring out, the scene changes to a ferry ship, "The Golden Fleece", in the docks as the passengers embark for the two days' journey to Gibraltar. Amongst the crew, there is much dismay, and the chief officer, Carlos Ricco (Charles Goldner) takes to his cabin with the clear intention of getting drunk. He is interrupted by an elderly gentleman, Lawrence St. James (Miles Malleson), who had come to speak with his nephew, Captain Henry St. James, on an unspecified, but urgent, matter. He is profoundly shocked to learn that the grief he had encountered on the ship is due to the death of the man he had travelled from England to see. He begs Ricco to explain what has led to such an event. He learns that his nephew Henry was the prosperous owner and skipper of this small passenger ship, which he captained as it ferried regularly to and fro between Gibraltar and Kalique, a port in North Africa.

Flashback to Morocco. Henry St. James lives with his lover, Nita (Yvonne De Carlo)a young, hot-blooded, exotic lady. She is 23 years younger than he and refers to him as "her Jimmy". He takes her out every night to expensive, fashionable restaurants and night clubs, where they lead a loud and wild lifestyle. In Gibraltar, he shares his life with Maud (Celia Johnson)his devoted, domesticated wife, 15 years his juniorliving a respectable, sober existence, and going to bed every night no later than ten o'clock with mugs of cocoa. St James gives Nita lingerie. He gives Maud a vacuum cleaner. Both are delighted. On board his ship, he disdains all female company, choosing intellectual discussions with male passengers at the Captain's table. He has found a perfect existencehis paradise.

Growing perhaps complacent, St. James makes a careless mistake. This leads to Ricco, up until then believing Nita to be the captain's wife, discovering that the true Mrs St James is living in Gibraltar. Ricco is glad to assist St. James in maintaining the deception and is soon called into action when Maud flies to Kalique and by chance meets Nita. St. James arranges to have Maud arrested before she and Nita realise that they are married to the same man. He convinces Maud that Morocco is a dangerous place and that she should never return there.

The years pass by. Maud has twins. She is thrilled with her two boys, but when they are sent to school in England, Maud is no longer enamoured with her existence. She wants to dance and drink gin. On the other hand, Nita wants to stay home and cook for her man. Henry is dismayed and makes every effort to keep everything just the way it was. His attempts to maintain the status quo result in both women taking lovers. When St James discovers Nita's infidelity, he leaves the flat as she continues the argument with her lover, Absalom. Nita shoots and kills her lover. In order to protect Nita, Captain St. James claims that he was the killer.

The execution is then shown, but the firing squad swing their rifles to the left and shoot their commanding officer. St. James hands them money and walks away.

Cast 

 Alec Guinness – Captain Henry St. James
 Charles Goldner – Chief Officer Carlos Ricco
 Miles Malleson – Lawrence St. James
 Yvonne De Carlo – Nita
 Celia Johnson – Maud
 Bill Fraser – Absalom
 Peter Bull – Firing-squad commander
 Nicholas Phipps – The Major
 Ambrosine Phillpotts – Marjorie
 Ferdy Mayne – The Sheikh
 Sebastian Cabot – Ali (vendor)
 Arthur Gomez – Chief steward
 George Benson – Mr. Salmon
 Bernard Rebel – Mr Wheeler
 Joyce Barbour – Mrs Reid, the housekeeper
 Claudia Grey – Susan Dailey
 Ann Hefferman – Daphne Bligh
 Walter Crisham – Bob
 Roger Delgado – Kalikan policeman

Production
The film was based on an original story by Alec Coppel. Nicholas Phipps wrote the script.

The original title was Paradise. In 1951, it was announced that Rex Harrison and Lilli Palmer would star. The following year press reports said Laurence Olivier and Vivien Leigh were going to star, with Olivier to direct and Alex Korda to possibly produce.

Olivier and Leigh became unavailable. According to Yvonne De Carlo, when she was offered her role by director Anthony Kimmins, she agreed to do it if Alec Guinness played the lead. Kimmins said it was unlikely to get Guinness and that they would probably go for Ray Milland or Michael Wilding; De Carlo urged they try Guinness anyway and the actor accepted. Alec Guinness had a contract with Alex Korda to make one film a year - his casting was announced in Variety in October 1952. Celia Johnson signed to play the other lead.

Kimmins said: "We're trying to show man's triple side... there's the domestic wife – pipe and slippers side; then the jungle side – the girl-in-port sort of thing. Then there's the conversational, man-to-man side... And naturally we stay tongue in cheek throughout so we don't expect to wreck any homes."

Filming finished in March 1953. Yvonne De Carlo said she enjoyed the film because she "got the chance to act". She found working with Guinness "an exhilarating experience".

Release

UK release
The film was a hit at the British box office.

US release
The film was refused approval by the US Production Code on the ground it was immoral because the lead character was a bigamist. An extra scene was shot to say St James only lived with Nita in North Africa, he was not married to her, he was only married to Maud. This allowed the film to be released.

There were further issues with censors in the US. The film was banned in Maryland because it "made light of marriage".

Eventually further changes were made. A line referring to Guinness' character as a "saint" was cut, and an epilogue added to the end which stated the film was only a fairytale.

The movie was seen widely in the USA. A Variety article in January 1954 said:
Rising popularity of Britain's Alec Guinness among U. S. pic audiences is reflected in the fact that... [the film] is expected to outgross all that has gone before it... it has grossed $350,000 so far in 29 dates and is being helped along also by its much publicized difficulties with both the Production Code and local censors. If it continues its present pace, “Paradise” may gross more than the three prior Guinness pix together. “Lavender Hill Mob” so far has done $580,000; “Man in the White Suit” $460,000, and “The Promoter” $480,000.
In April 1954, Variety observed:
Guinness films have usually won praise from the key-city critics but until now had limited pull beyond the “art" circuit. But with his current “Captain's Paradise” he's now bigtime b.o. Pic... figures to ring up $1,000,000 in theatre rentals in the U. S. and Canada...“Paradise" has chalked up $630,000 in distribution loot in less than 1,500 dates. UA figures the film is a cinch to play a total of 5,000 bookings— exhibitor deals are being set at the rate of over 200 a week — and on this basis the $1,000,000 in total rentals looks for sure. Pic has been an especially remarkable click at the Paris Theatre, N.. Y., where the run is now in its 30th week and likely will continue for about another month.
By November 1954 it had earned $900,000.

Critical reviews 
In the Winter 2022/3 edition of The UK's Media Education Journal Colin McArthur in an essay 'Unacknowledged Parable of (de)Colonialisation' he explores the film in terms of its 'serious account of the inevitability of decolonialisation.

DVD 
Included as part of the Alec Guinness Collection,The Captain's Paradise was released on DVD in September 2002.

References

External links 
 
 
Review of film at Variety
Entire film on the Internet Archive

1953 films
British comedy films
1953 comedy films
London Films films
Films about capital punishment
Films about polygamy
Films directed by Anthony Kimmins
Films shot in Gibraltar
Films scored by Malcolm Arnold
Films about con artists
British black-and-white films
1950s British films
English-language comedy films